"Thumper" is a single by British band Enter Shikari from their 2010 compilation album Tribalism. It was released on 12 February 2010 on iTunes.

Music video
Directed and animated by Joseph Pierce, the video shows the band performing in black and white. The video also uses a Rotoscoping technique, much like A-ha's Take On Me video.

Track listing
Promo single

DVD single

Personnel
Enter Shikari
Roughton "Rou" Reynolds – lead vocals, synthesizer, keyboards, programming
Chris Batten – bass guitar, backing vocals
Liam "Rory" Clewlow – guitar, backing vocals
Rob Rolfe – drums, percussion, background vocals

Production
Enter Shikari – production, mixing
Andy Gray – production, mixing
Dan Weller – guitar production

Charts

References

Enter Shikari songs
2010 singles
Wikipedia requested audio of songs
2010 songs